The 2017–18 Süper Lig, officially called the Spor Toto Süper Lig İlhan Cavcav season, was the 60th season of the Süper Lig, the highest tier football league of Turkey. The season was named after İlhan Cavcav, the longtime chairman of Gençlerbirliği S.K.

Teams
Sivasspor, Yeni Malatyaspor and Göztepe achieved promotion from 2016–17 TFF First League. Sivasspor made an immediate return, whereas Yeni Malatyaspor promoted to the top level for the first time in their history. Finally, Göztepe defeated Eskişehirspor in the play-off final.
Çaykur Rizespor, Gaziantepspor and Adanaspor were relegated to 2017–18 TFF First League.

Stadia and locations

Personnel and sponsorship

Managerial changes

League table

Results

Positions by round
The following table represents the teams' positions after each round in the competition.

Statistics

Top goalscorers

Top assists

Hat-tricks

Note
4 Player scored 4 goals

Awards

Annual awards

Team of the Year

See also
 2017–18 Turkish Cup
 2017–18 TFF First League
 2017–18 TFF Second League
 2017–18 TFF Third League

References

External links

 

 

Turk
1
Süper Lig seasons